My Hero, known as  in Japan, is a side-scrolling beat 'em up game released by Sega for arcades in 1985 and for the Master System on January 1, 1986. It was designed by Kotaro Hayashida.

The gameplay format is similar to Irem's Kung-Fu Master, released in 1984. In contrast to earlier martial arts games, My Hero departs from a more traditional martial arts setting, instead taking place in a contemporary urban city environment with street gangs, like later beat 'em ups such as Renegade (1986) and Double Dragon (1987).

Gameplay

The arcade version consists of three different levels, each continuing in an endless loop until the player runs out of lives. It starts out with the player character (named Takeshi in Japan, and Steven according to the European arcade flyer) on a city street watching as a street thug runs off with his girlfriend (named Remy, also according to the arcade flyer, Mari in Japan). As he pursues him, he must fight off gangs of other various street thugs. Halfway through the level, Steven has an opportunity to save a captive bystander who (if rescued) will help him fight until the bystander is killed. Soon (after jumping across platforms and dodging fireballs) Steven arrives on a beach and fights the thug that has captured Remy. After the level boss is defeated by after being hit 10 times, the level is complete. This same process repeats for the remainder of the game, only with two other bosses and stage designs. The second stage design resembles an Edo Japanese ninja epic, with ninja themed enemies and boss, followed by a sci-fi theme loosely based upon Planet of the Apes, including ape/human enemies and a boss.

Due to space limitations on the Sega Card, the Sega Master System port only features the street gang in 3 stages that go in a continuous loop until the player loses all lives and gets a game over. The ninjas and the ape/human enemies from the arcade version are omitted.

Reception
In Japan, Game Machine listed My Hero on their August 1, 1985, issue as being the most successful table arcade unit of the month.

Mike Roberts and Steve Phipps of Computer Gamer magazine reviewed the arcade game positively. They said that, though "a bit more basic than the incredible" Hang-On, it "is still quite enjoyable" and "an amusing variation on the kung-fu game theme." They said the "setting and the good graphics make this an enjoyable game to play", along with some "quite difficult" puzzles.

See also
 Flashgal (1985)

References

External links
The My Hero arcade flyer
My Hero at arcade-history

1985 video games
Arcade video games
Sega beat 'em ups
Fighting games
Master System games
Platform games
Sega arcade games
Banpresto games
Sega System 1 games
Video games developed in Japan